The Dead & Company Summer Tour 2018 is a concert tour by the rock band Dead & Company during May, June, and July 2018. It is the band’s fifth tour, following their 2017 Fall Tour (which overflowed into 2018 after several shows were postponed when John Mayer had an emergency appendectomy). The tour comprises a total of 24 concerts in 19 different cities between May 30 and July 14, 2018.

Prior to the 2018 Summer Tour, in addition to the three rescheduled dates from the 2017 Fall tour, the band performed three shows — February 15, 17 and 18 — at the Barceló Maya resort in Riviera Maya, Mexico.  The event, billed as a "concert vacation", was called Playing In The Sand (a pun on the Grateful Dead song "Playing in the Band").
They wrapped up the summer tour with a two-night stop at the Lockn' Festival.

The band Dead & Company includes three former members of the Grateful Dead – Bob Weir, Bill Kreutzmann, and Mickey Hart – along with Mayer, Jeff Chimenti, and Oteil Burbridge.

Tour dates
The tour consists of total of 26 concerts in 20 different U.S. cities.

Musicians
Mickey Hart – drums, percussion
Bill Kreutzmann – drums
John Mayer – lead guitar, lead/backing vocals
Bob Weir – rhythm guitar, lead/backing vocals
Oteil Burbridge – bass guitar, percussion, lead/backing vocals
Jeff Chimenti – keyboards, backing & occasional lead vocals

See also
 Reunions of the Grateful Dead

References

External links
Dead & Company official website

2018 concert tours
Dead & Company concert tours